Cincinnatus is a public artwork by Richard Haas in Cincinnati, Ohio, United States. The mural depicts Lucius Quinctius Cincinnatus, the namesake of Cincinnati. It's on the Brotherhood Building at Central Parkway and Vine Street. It was commissioned by the Kroger Company 1983 in honor of their 100th year of business. In 2015, the mural was restored by ArtWorks in collaboration with the original artist.

References

Arts in Cincinnati
Murals in Ohio